The R41 is a provincial route in Gauteng, South Africa, that connects Johannesburg with Randfontein via Roodepoort.

Route

The R41 route begins in the Newtown suburb of Johannesburg, at an intersection with the two one-way-streets of the R24 route (Albertina Sisulu Road and Commissioner Street). The route begins by going west-south-west, named Main Reef Road and meeting the western end of the R29 Route. South-west of the city centre, in the suburb of Crown (adjacent to Selby), the R41 meets the western end of the M2 Johannesburg-Germiston Highway (Francois Oberholzer Freeway), meets the M17 Road of Johannesburg and continues west, bypassing various Chinese marts and shopping centres in the area.

North of the Riverlea Suburb, the R41 meets Johannesburg's M5 road (Nasrec Road), which heads south to FNB Stadium and Aeroton. Continuing west, the R41 crosses over the N1 Highway (Johannesburg Western Bypass) as a flyover and enters the southern suburbs of Roodepoort. It bypasses Florida and the old Roodepoort CBD to the south (meeting the south-western terminus of the R564) before going west towards Randfontein. At this point, the street name changes from Main Reef Road to Randfontein Road. The R24 Road is mostly parallel and is an alternative route between Johannesburg and Roodepoort.

After Roodepoort, the R41 continues westwards, crosses the R558 Road and quickly enters the Mogale City Local Municipality, bypassing the township of Kagiso. It continues westwards to enter the town of Randfontein in the Rand West City Local Municipality.

North of Randfontein Central, the R41 meets the R28 Road from Krugersdorp and they are cosigned as one road southwards for 800 metres before the R41 becomes its own road westwards. It heads west for 29 kilometres, through Randfontein Rural and a few farming properties, to end at an intersection with the R500 Road, 3 kilometres south of the R500's intersection with the N14 National Route.

References

External links
 Routes Travel Info

41 
Provincial routes in South Africa
Streets and roads of Johannesburg